The 2015 Currie Cup First Division was contested from 29 August to 8 October 2015. The tournament (also known as the Absa Currie Cup First Division for sponsorship reasons) was the second tier of South Africa's premier domestic rugby union competition, featuring teams representing either entire provinces or substantial regions within provinces.

The Leopards also went through the season unbeaten, winning their five matches in the 2015 Currie Cup qualification that counted towards the First Division and the seven matches player in the First Division proper.

After the season, all six teams joined the eight Premier Division teams and Namibia in an expanded 15-team Currie Cup competition for 2016.

Competition rules and information

There were six participating teams in the 2015 Currie Cup First Division. The six teams played each other twice over the course of the season, once at home and once away. The first series of fixtures were played as part of the 2015 Currie Cup qualification competition, with all results carried forward to the First Division except for the match against the 2015 Currie Cup Premier Division qualifier, . A second set of fixtures then followed between the remaining six teams.

Each team received four points for a win and two points for a draw. Bonus points were awarded to teams that scored 4 or more tries in a game, as well as to teams that lost a match by 7 points or less. Teams were ranked by points, then points difference (points scored less points conceded).

The top 4 teams qualified for the title play-offs. In the semi-finals, the team that finished first had home advantage against the team that finished fourth, while the team that finished second had home advantage against the team that finished third. The winners of these semi-finals played each other in the final, at the home venue of the higher-placed team.

Teams

Following the 2015 Currie Cup qualification competition, the following six teams were confirmed as the competitors in the 2015 Currie Cup First Division:

Log
The final log of the round-robin stage of the 2015 Currie Cup First Division is:
The teams' playing records from the 2015 Currie Cup qualification series brought forward to the First Division were as follows:

Round-by-round

The table below shows each team's progression throughout the season.

For each round, each team's cumulative points total is shown with the overall log position in brackets.

Fixtures and results

All the results from the 2015 Currie Cup qualification tournament was carried forward into the First Division season. The results against the 2015 Currie Cup Premier Division qualifier –  – was discarded.

The following matches were played in the 2015 Currie Cup First Division:

Round Eight

The  secured a semi-final spot after beating the  36–31 in a match in Potchefstroom. Leopards captain Juan Language scored a hat-trick and tighthead prop John-Roy Jenkinson got two tries, while SWD fly-half Leighton Eksteen contributed 16 points with the boot to secure a bonus point for the visitors.

Round Nine

The  guaranteed themselves a home semi-final after beating the  47–12 in Wellington. Despite Boland taking the lead in the first minute through a Danwel Demas try, the Leopards responded with seven tries scored by seven different players. One of the try-scorers was Adriaan Engelbrecht, who also converted six of the tries for a personal haul of 17 points. Griffons captain Nicky Steyn scored a try in the first half in his 121st and final match for the side from Welkom. In the final match of the round, the  scored a try in the final minute of the match to beat the  21–17 in George, despite the home team playing the majority of the match with 14 players after the sending off of Clinton Wagman in the 28th minute.

Round Ten

The  secure a semi-final berth after demolishing the  76–12 in Kempton Park. They scored twelve tries in the victory from ten different try-scorers, with Etienne Taljaard and Shane Kirkwood getting two each, while Jaun Kotzé converted eight of the tries. Schalk Hugo and Tyler Fisher each scored two tries for the Leopards and Adriaan Engelbrecht kicked 17 points for the Leopards. In the other match of the round, the  beat the  31–19 in East London. Both teams scored three tries, but 16 points from the boot of SWD Eagles fly-half Leighton Eksteen proved decisive in the match.

Round Eleven

Defending champions the  secured their place in the semi-finals by beating the  30–21 in a match in Welkom. Despite having three players sin-binned during the course of the match and being down to thirteen players at one stage, the home side won the match and secured a bonus point for scoring five tries in the match, with prop Danie van der Merwe and loose-forward Vincent Maruping getting two tries each. The  finalised the semi-final line-up by beating the  57–14 in Wellington. Charles Radebe and Brian Skosana each got a hat-trick of tries in the victory as the SWD Eagles ran in nine tries to end Boland's play-off hopes. There was nearly a major upset in the top-versus-bottom match as the  needed a late Adriaan Engelbrecht penalty to beat the  32–30 in Potchefstroom.

Round Twelve

The  concluded the round-robin stage of their Currie Cup campaign with a perfect record; not only did they win all five of their matches, as well as their five matches in the 2015 Currie Cup qualification series that were brought forward to the First Division, but they also gained a four-try bonus point in each of their ten matches to top the log on 50 points. Tyler Fisher scored two of their six tries in their 36–29 win over a  side that scored five tries of their own. The  won the match between two sides without a victory to their name since the qualification tournament, beating the  44–20 in East London. Lundi Ralarala and Oliver Zono scored two tries each for the home side, who finished bottom of the log, one point behind the Boland Cavaliers.

Title Play-Off Games

Semi-finals

The Falcons caused an upset in 2014 by beating the Leopards, but the Leopards prevailed on this occasion, despite being outscored three tries to two. Five penalties from centre Adriaan Engelbrecht secured a 29–17 win for the side from Potchefstroom to secure a home final. There, they will face the SWD Eagles, who beat defending champions the Griffons 47–40 in Welkom. Both sides scored five tries in the encounter, but six penalties from SWD Eagles fly-half Leighton Eksteen (who contributed 27 points in the match) decided the semi-final in the away team's favour.

Final

The  won the Currie Cup First Division by overturning a 10–20 half-time deficit to beat the  44–20 in Potchefstroom. Leopards captain Juan Language scored two tries for the hosts in the second half to aid his side's comeback, also becoming the top scorer in the competition in the process. The top points scorer in the competition was SWD Eagles back Leighton Eksteen, who scored ten of his side's 20 points on the night.

Honours

The honour roll for the 2015 Currie Cup First Division was:

Players

Points scorers

The following table contain points which were scored in the 2015 Currie Cup First Division:

Appearances

The player appearance record in the 2015 Currie Cup First Division is as follows:

For each team, (c) denotes the team captain. For each match, the player's squad number is shown. Starting players are numbered 1 to 15, while the replacements are numbered 16 to 22. "App" refers to the number of appearances made by the player, "Try" to the number of tries scored by the player, "Kck" to the number of points scored via kicks (conversions, penalties or drop goals) and "Pts" refer to the total number of points scored by the player.

Discipline

The following table contains all the cards handed out during the tournament:

Referees

The following referees officiated matches in the 2015 Currie Cup First Division:

See also

 2015 Currie Cup Premier Division
 2015 Currie Cup qualification
 2015 Vodacom Cup
 2015 Under-21 Provincial Championship Group A
 2015 Under-21 Provincial Championship Group B
 2015 Under-19 Provincial Championship Group A
 2015 Under-19 Provincial Championship Group B

References

2014
2015 Currie Cup